The 2000 United States presidential election in Maine took place on November 7, 2000, and was part of the 2000 United States presidential election. Maine is one of two states in the U.S. that instead of all of the state's four electors of the Electoral College to vote based upon the statewide results of the voters, two of the individual electors vote based on their congressional district because Maine has two congressional districts. The other two electors vote based upon the statewide results. 

Democratic nominee Vice President Al Gore won the state with 49.09% of the vote over Republican Governor of Texas George W. Bush, who received 43.97%. Maine is the only state besides Nebraska that can split its electoral votes between different candidates, and it did in 2016 and 2020, awarding one electoral vote from the second Congressional district to Donald Trump each time despite his losing the state overall. The last Republican to carry Maine at large was Bush's father, George H. W. Bush, in 1988. , this is the last election in which Waldo County and Lincoln County voted for the Republican candidate.

Bush was the first Republican to win without the state since Richard Nixon in 1968.

Results

Statewide

Congressional District 
Gore won both congressional districts.

By county

Counties that flipped from Democratic to Republican
 Lincoln (Largest city: Waldoboro)
 Penobscot (Largest city: Bangor)
 Piscataquis (Largest city: Dover-Foxcroft)
 Waldo (Largest city: Belfast)
 Washington (Largest city: Calais)

See also
 United States presidential elections in Maine

References

2000
2000
Maine